Mimi Aguglia (21 December 1884 – 31 July 1970) was an Italian actress, born Girolama Aguglia in Palermo, Sicily, while her mother, actress Giuseppina Aguglia, was playing Desdemona in Othello.

Biography
She was born in the wings of the St. Cecile theatre in Palermo, Italy on 21 December 1884.

She was doing warm-up acts for her famous actress mother by the time she was five. She went on to tour both Italy and Europe and became an internationally famous theatrical actress in her own right. 

Mimi Aguglia to the United States with her family in November 1908 and her American stage debut came in 1909. She was "discovered" by Hollywood in 1924, and from the 1930s until her death was a much requested character actress in movies. Her daughter Argentina Brunetti (1907–2005) was also an actress. 

Aguglia played in The Goldbergs on CBS radio in the early 1940s. She also worked at radio station WOV, broadcasting in Italian. She also played Mama Rome in the film noir Cry of the City. 

She died on 31 July 1970.

Family
Aguglia was married and had three children, two of whom worked in radio.

Selected filmography
 The Last Man on Earth (1924)
 Primavera en otoño (1933)
 The Outlaw (1943)
 Carnival in Costa Rica (1947)
 Captain from Castile (1947)
 Cry of the City (1948)
 That Midnight Kiss (1949)
 Deported (1950)
 Right Cross (1950)
 The Man Who Cheated Himself (1950)
 Cuban Fireball (1951)
 The Rose Tattoo (1955)

References

External links

 
 

1884 births
1970 deaths
Actors from Catania
Italian stage actresses
Italian film actresses
Place of death missing
20th-century Italian actresses